Christian Amoroso (born 22 September 1976) is an Italian football coach and former footballer who played as a midfielder. He is the head coach of Serie D club Seravezza Pozzi.

Playing career
After spells with Fiorentina and Empoli, Amoroso was signed by Bologna in the summer of 2002, on a free transfer.

On 11 August 2009, he signed a 1-year contract with Ascoli of Serie B. He played his first match for the club on 15 August, a Coppa Italia match losing to Cittadella in 1–2. He ended his playing career with his hometown club, Pisa.

Coaching career
On 14 June 2017, he was appointed head coach of Sestri Levante

On 21 July 2019, he joined Serie D club Real Forte.

After leaving Real Forte Querceta by the end of the 2020–21 season, on 13 December 2022 Amoroso was hired as new head coach of Serie D club Seravezza Pozzi.

Honours
Fiorentina
Coppa Italia: 2000–01

References

External links
 Profile at La Gazzetta
 Bologna F.C. Player Profile
 Christian Amoroso National Team Stats at FIGC.it

Italian footballers
Association football midfielders
Italy under-21 international footballers
Empoli F.C. players
ACF Fiorentina players
Bologna F.C. 1909 players
Ascoli Calcio 1898 F.C. players
Pisa S.C. players
Sportspeople from Pisa
1976 births
Living people
Serie A players
Serie B players
Italian football managers
Footballers from Tuscany